The Battle of Campo Osório, also known as the Combat of Campo Osório, was fought on 24 June 1895 between federalist rebel forces and loyalist troops of the First Brazilian Republic, being the last battle of the Federalist Revolution.

Battle
The rebels, led by admiral Luís Filipe de Saldanha da Gama, former leader of the Second Navy Revolt, were defeated by the troops of general Hyppolito Ribeiro in Campo Osório, an area near the border with Uruguay and north of the Rincão de Artigas, within the municipality of Santana do Livramento, in Rio Grande do Sul. Alongside the Federalists also fought the Navy mutineers following the admiral. 

The battle resulted in the death of Saldanha da Gama, one of the main leaders of the federalists and, consequently, in the weakening of the revolution, which was officially ended with a peace treaty signed in Pelotas, between the government and Joca Tavares on behalf of the rebels, in August 23 of the same year.

References

Bibliography
 
 
 
 
 

Campo Osório